Dziesięciny may refer to:

Dziesięciny I, one of the districts of the City of Białystok
Dziesięciny II, one of the districts of the City of Białystok